Crystal Fairy is the eponymous debut album by the rock supergroup Crystal Fairy, released on February 24, 2017 via Ipecac Recordings.

Recording
The album was reportedly written and recorded in a week, with a fluid and spontaneous process. Osborne and Crover would be in one room working on riffs. Rodríguez-López would be in another working on bass lines, and Suárez would be in another, creating lyrics for demos that had just been tracked. She abandoned her usual, deliberate writing technique in favour of improvisation: "the songs wrote and interpreted themselves."

Lyrics and themes
Drugs are a recurring theme on the record.

The title track (and the name of the band itself) is a likely reference to the 2013 Chilean film Crystal Fairy & the Magical Cactus.

Reception

Crystal Fairy received generally favorable reviews.

AllMusic's James Christopher Monger praised the album as "impressive stuff, and that it feels like the work of a much more seasoned crew of bandmates suggests that they had as much fun making it as the listener will have devouring it".

Consequence of Sounds Meghan Roos summarized it as "a heavy, artsy, and dramatic record that offers more with each listen".

Track listing
All music and lyrics written by Crystal Fairy, except where noted.

PersonnelCrystal FairyTeri Gender Bender – lead vocals, guitar, keyboards
Buzz Osborne – guitar, vocals
Dale Crover – drums, guitar
Omar Rodríguez-López – bass, guitarTechnical'
Chris Common – recording, mixing, mastering
Toshi Kasai – recording
Mackie Osborne – artwork design

References

Crystal Fairy (band) albums
2017 debut albums